Fania may refer to:

Music 
 "Fania", 1960 song by Estrellas de Chocolate
 Fania Records, salsa label named after the song
 Fania All-Stars, salsa band named after the label

People 
 Stefania (name)
 Fania Bergstein (1908–1950), Hebrew poet
 Fania Borach (1891–1951), American entertainer, known as Fanny Brice
 Fania Fénelon (1908–1983), French singer
 Fania Marinoff (1890–1971), Russian-American actress
 Fania Mindell (1894–1969), American activist
 Fania Noël, Franco-Haitian author and activist
 Fania Oz-Salzberger (born 1960), Israeli historian
 Fania Weissmann-Kollmann (born 1916), Israeli botanist

Other 
 Fania (moth)
 Fania language